Arthur Robert Hawes (2 October 1895 – 1963) was an English footballer who played for Sunderland as an inside forward. He made his debut for Sunderland on 24 December 1921 against West Bromwich Albion in a 5–0 at Roker Park where he also scored two goals. He played for Sunderland from 1921 to 1927 where he made 139 league appearances and scored 39 goals.

References
Arthur Hawes's careers stats at The Stat Cat

1895 births
1963 deaths
Association football forwards
English footballers
Norwich City F.C. players
South Shields F.C. (1889) players
Sunderland A.F.C. players
Bradford (Park Avenue) A.F.C. players
Accrington Stanley F.C. (1891) players
Nelson F.C. players
Rochdale A.F.C. players
English Football League players
People from Swanton Morley